Janaki Sabesh is an Indian media professional, actor, model, storyteller, author of children's book, theatre and voiceover artist. Throughout her film career, she has played the "screen mother" to several leading actors, appearing predominantly in Tamil and Telugu movies.

Early life
Janaki was born in Bangalore. She did her initial schooling in Carmel School, Kolkata and then from DTEA Senior Secondary School, New Delhi. She holds a bachelor's degree in political science from Lady Shri Ram College for Women, Delhi and a master's degree in mass communication from Jamia Millia, Delhi.

Career
In 1991, Janaki Sabesh assisted Simi Garewal with her documentary on Rajiv Gandhi called India's Rajiv. She made her professional acting debut in the movie Minsara Kanavu starring Kajol and Arvind Swamy, in which she played a nun. She later went on to act in Shankar's magnum opus Jeans, where she played Aishwarya Rai's mother. Since then, she has acted in over 25 movies, including the blockbuster hits Minnale and  Ghilli, often playing the role of a mother.

She has modelled for leading brands like Cadburys, Pepsodent, KFJ, NAC jewellers, Chakra Gold Tea, Jansons Dhoti to name a few. She has also appeared in a web series titled Black Sheep on the YouTube channel of Stray Factory, Rascalas.Janaki's work as a theatre artist includes plays with Chennai-based theatre groups, Crea- Shakti & Madras Players.Janaki Sabesh's engagement with children began when she produced an audio cassette “The Learning Train” (1995) that simplified the world of numbers through story and songs.

She also runs her own storytelling initiative, Golpo - Tales Unlimited. The word Golpo in Bengali means "story". Her sessions are an interactive mix of narration, music and movement. She also conducts workshops for parents, teachers and students which centre on motivation and the productive uses of storytelling.

Janaki Sabesh turned an author in 2018 with her first picture book, "The Jungle Storytelling Festival" published by Tulika in 9 languages. Her 2nd picture book Paati's Rasam (co-authored with Dhwani Sabesh) won the Best Children's Book Award at Jarul 2023, also shortlisted (top 3) at the Neev Book Awards 2022.

Selected filmography

References

Press articles 

 
https://www.thenewsminute.com/article/ghilli-amma-childrens-writer-meet-janaki-sabesh-her-new-avatar-86615
https://www.thehindu.com/society/history-and-culture/karadis-tales-of-learning/article18970654.ece
http://www.newindianexpress.com/cities/chennai/2017/aug/23/happiness-is-not-elusive-anymore-1647306.html
https://www.deccanchronicle.com/entertainment/mollywood/181217/sabash-janaki.html

Indian film actresses
Living people
Actresses from Bangalore
Year of birth missing (living people)
Actresses in Tamil cinema
Actresses in Telugu cinema
21st-century Indian actresses
Actresses in Malayalam cinema